The Bengal-ITC SRA Classical Music Festival is a major South Asian classical music festival held in Dhaka, the capital of Bangladesh. It is one of the world's largest music festivals devoted to South Asian classical music and draws leading musicians from Bangladesh and India.

References 

Cultural festivals in Dhaka
Music festivals in Bangladesh
Classical music festivals in Bangladesh